The Plaine des Sables is a volcanic plateau in the mountains of Réunion. Part of the Piton de la Fournaise massif, this volcanic desert is situated at the border of Saint-Joseph and Sainte-Rose, within Réunion National Park.

References

Sables
Sables
Sables
Volcanic deserts
Deserts of Africa
Saint-Joseph, Réunion
Réunion National Park